The 1996 Independence Bowl was a post-season American college football bowl game at Independence Stadium in Shreveport, Louisiana between the Army Cadets and the Auburn Tigers on December 31, 1996. The game was the final contest of the 1996 NCAA Division I-A football season for both teams, and ended in a 32–29 victory for Auburn, after Jay Parker's 27-yard field goal went wide right.}

Scoring summary
First Quarter
Auburn: Holmes 31-yard field goal
Auburn: Goodson 30-yard touchdown pass from Craig (Holmes kick)

Second Quarter
Auburn: Gosha 7-yard touchdown pass from Craig, (Holmes kick)
Auburn: Holmes 49-yard field goal
Army: Williams 3-yard touchdown run, (Parker kick)

Third Quarter 
Auburn: Craig 33-yard touchdown run
Auburn: Williams 18-yard touchdown run

Fourth Quarter
Army: Perry 12-yard touchdown run, (Parker kick)
Army: B. Williams 1-yard touchdown run, (Parker kick)
Army: Richardson 30-yard touchdown pass from McAda (Williams run)

References

Independence Bowl
Independence Bowl
Army Black Knights football bowl games
Auburn Tigers football bowl games
Independence Bowl
Independence Bowl